The Yungas antwren or ashy antwren (Myrmotherula grisea) is a bird species in the family Thamnophilidae and is endemic to Bolivia.

Its natural habitats are subtropical or tropical dry forests and subtropical or tropical moist montane forests. It is becoming rare due to habitat loss.

It was formerly classified as a Vulnerable species by the IUCN. But new research has shown it to be not as rare as it was believed. Consequently, it is downlisted to Near Threatened status in 2008, and to Least Concern in 2012.

References

External links

Yungas antwren
Endemic birds of Bolivia
Birds of the Yungas
Yungas antwren
Taxonomy articles created by Polbot